Ibrahim Bijli Syed (born March 16, 1939) is an American Radiological Scientist/Medical Physicist/Health Physicist and the immediate past president of Islamic Research Foundation International. He was born in Bellary, Karnataka, the son of Mumtaz Begum and B. Syed Ahmed. Ibrahim B. Syed married Sajida Begum Shariff who graduated with M.Sc. degree from Central College, Bengaluru of the University of Mysore. They are blessed with one son, Mubin I. Syed, M.D., F.A.C.R., F.S.I.R., He is an Interventional and Neuroradiologist who works at Dayton Interventional Radiology, in Dayton, Ohio. Mubin married Afshan Ahmed. They are blessed with a son (Rehan), two daughters (Nadia and Lena). Rehan graduated from the Dayton University and Nadia earned her M.Sc. from the Johns Hopkins University. Lena is a student  in George Washington University. Ibrahim B. Syed has one daughter, Zafrin B. Syed, M.D., who is a practicing Psychiatrist in Louisville, Kentucky.

Syed promotes Islamic Renaissance or Intellectual Upliftment of Muslims through Critical Thinking, Opposing Points of View, and Ijtihad. He is a multilinguist with fluency in many languages, such as Telugu, Kannada, Tamil, Hindi, Urdu, German, Spanish, Sanskrit and Arabic. He is a Student of Comparative Religion.

At age 18 he became the fastest typing Champion in Ballari District, typing at the Speed of 100 words per minute with no mistakes. The normal speed is 35 words per minute. Also at age 18 he passed the Junior Level and Senior Level professional Typing Certificate examinations. Furthermore he passed the Junior Level and Senior Level professional Stenographer (short-hand) examinations. He holds 34 professional Licensing Certificates, Diplomas, Degrees, Fellowships and three doctorate Degrees. He is the highest educated person in Louisville and in the State of Kentucky. He is also the highest educated person in Ballari District, Karnataka State( India) and perhaps the only highest educated Muslim in India. He is a judge of the Kentucky Science and Engineering Fair. and is a member of the Curiosity Council, Smithsonian Institutions, Washington, D.C. (2018- today)

Education 

Syed received his B.Sc. in physics in 1960. He obtained the B.Sc. as well as his M.Sc. degree in nuclear physics from the University of Mysore in India.

He is ranked in the top 10  in  the Rankings of the University of Mysore Alumni. [4]. Received D.R.P. (Diploma in Radiological Physics) from Bombay University ( Now Mumbai University) after one year training at B.A.R.C.(Bhabha Atomic Research Center), Mumbai   in 1964.
Before his appointment as Chief Physicist at Halifax Infirmary, Halifax, NS, Canada he worked as the First Medical Physicist of Karnataka State and assigned to the Victoria Hospital in Bengaluru (1964 – 1967).

He is the First Muslim Medical Physicist of India. He is one of the Oldest Faculty Members in the World.

In 1972, he obtained a D.Sc. in radiological sciences from Johns Hopkins University.

He is the first Indian ever to earn a doctorate degree in nuclear medicine sciences from Johns Hopkins University.

In 1984, he was awarded an honorary Ph.D. from the International University in Malta.

After completing his education, Syed entered the field of radiation safety. When asked about how he came into this field, he said, "When I did my postgraduate studies in radiological physics, radiation safety was part of the curricula. When I worked as Chief of Medical Physics in India, Canada, and the United States, radiation safety was part of my job responsibilities. While pursuing my Master's degree in nuclear physics, I became fascinated with health physics. Since then, I have tried to learn as much of this field as possible."

In 2013 he was conferred with an Honorary Doctorate degree, D.Sc. (Honoris Causa) by the Vijayanagara Sri Krishnadevaraya University in Ballari.

In 2017 the Veerashaiva College, Ballari  honored him with the Distinguished Alumnus Award.

Positions 

Syed is a Clinical Professor of Medicine at the University of Louisville School of Medicine , and a former Professor of Nuclear Medicine.

He is a Fellow of the American College of Radiology, the American Institute of Chemists, the British Institute of Physics, and the Royal Society of Health. He is a member of the New York Academy of Sciences and Sigma Xi, and a Diplomate of the American Board of Health Physics and of the American Board of Radiology, as well as an examiner for both boards. He functioned as a technical expert in nuclear medicine for the International Atomic Energy Agency (IAEA) with field missions to developing countries.    He also served as an expert in radiological physics for the United Nations Development Program,  and in cooperation with the Council of Scientific and Industrial Research (CSIR) Govt. of India,
visiting postgraduate medical institutions in India over a two-month period. Served as Medical Physicist  in Victoria Hospital, Bangalore (1964-1967) becoming The First Medical Physicist of Karnataka.

Syed is listed in several biographical reference works, including American Men and Women of Science and a number of Marquis Who's Who publications including Who’s Who in the World and Who’s Who in America. He is also a notary public in Kentucky, and is commissioned as a Kentucky Colonel. In 2002 he was given the Robert A. Miller Award for diversity.

 Lifetime Achievement Award by Marquis Who's Who publications  including Who's Who in America, Who's Who in the World.
 Panel Member,  Heavenly Culture World Peace and Restoration of Light (2014-todate  )
 Commissioner,  Enforcement Board, Human Relations Commission, Metro Louisville City  Government  (2010-todate  )
 Judge, Louisville Regional Science and Engineering Fair ( 2016-to date)
Judge, Kentucky Science and Engineering Fair (2019 – to date )
 Monthly contributor of articles to "Karnataka Association for Advancement of Science News"
Member,  Curiosity Council, Smithsonian Institutions, Washington, D.C. (2018-todate)

Work in the Islamic community 

Syed is a member of several Islamic organizations. He served as a treasurer and secretary in the Association of Muslim Scientists and Engineers. He is a founder and the immediate past president of Islamic Research Foundation International, headquartered in Louisville, and is a past managing editor of its publication, Aalim.

Syed has written more than 300 articles on a number of Islamic subjects, particularly on Islam and the Qur’an as they relate to science (for example, his article on the history of Islamic medicine). He is the author of the 2002 book Intellectual Achievements of the Muslims, the 2007 book Qur’anic Inspirations., and the book Knowledge Empowers You. He lectures on Islamic subjects at Islamic centers in the U.S. and abroad. Occasionally he serves as an imam (a spiritual leader) for Jumu'ah prayers at mosques in and outside of Louisville,
He is the Oldest Khatib (one who delivers Friday Sermons) in the World  and has volunteered as an imam at the Veterans Affairs Medical Center and many Kentucky prisons. He is also a qadi (a judge of religious law) and is licensed to perform Islamic marriages in Kentucky and Indiana.

 Author of " Knowledge Empowers You"  (Bengaluru, April 2016)
 Managing Editor of articles posted at the IRFI website:  www.irfi.org

Community service  
He served the Indian community in Louisville, as president of India Community Foundation, as a member of the board, vice chairman and finally chairman. He is regularly invited to the parliament of world religions conferences held every four years, in different countries of the world. He is a founding member and member of many Islamic Organizations in North America.
He served many Muslim communities as a secretary, treasurer, vice president and president including the association of Muslim scientists and Engineers of North America.

He is a founder and immediate past president of the Islamic research foundation international Inc., headquartered in Louisville, Kentucky. He is the past publisher and an associate editor of its publication Aalim. He is the convener of International conferences on "Islamic Renaissance" held in Chicago in 1995. He is the founder and chairman (Managing Trustee) of the Bijli Foundation Charitable Trust, located in Bellary,  Karnataka, India.

References 
 
Famous University Of Mysore Alumni

External links 
 Syed's Islamic articles and books
 Syed's articles on Islam

Johns Hopkins University alumni
Living people
American Muslims
Indian Muslims
American radiologists
1939 births
People from Bellary
American people of Indian descent in health professions
University of Louisville faculty
Physicians from Louisville, Kentucky